The 1884 United States presidential election in Connecticut took place on November 4, 1884, as part of the 1884 United States presidential election. Voters chose six representatives, or electors to the Electoral College, who voted for president and vice president.

Connecticut voted for the Democratic nominee, Grover Cleveland, over the Republican nominee, James G. Blaine. Cleveland won the state by a very narrow margin of 0.94%.

Results

See also
 United States presidential elections in Connecticut

References

Connecticut
1884
1884 Connecticut elections